Tan Wah Piow is currently a lawyer and a former Singapore student leader, who since 1976 lives in political exile in London. In 1987, he was accused by the Singapore government of being the alleged mastermind behind the Marxist Conspiracy. The Government of Singapore arrested 16 people for their role in an alleged Marxist Conspiracy, which involved plans to overthrow the government to form a Marxist state. According to the state media, Tan had been influenced by Marxist ideas since the early 1970s. In response, the government revoked his citizenship in 1987.

Early beginnings
Tan was president of the University of Singapore's Students' Union (USSU) in 1974. In his time there, Tan mobilized students to become active for democracy and social justice. He was purportedly involved in an industrial dispute which led to his arrest in November 1974 for unlawful assembly and rioting. Tan had allegedly instigated workers of American Marines (Singapore) to agitate against their employers. Tan was eventually convicted and sentenced to one year's imprisonment. In his judgement, Senior District Judge Mr T.S. Sinnathuray said: "The defence of a frame-up is a miserable and mischievous attempt that had altogether, failed." "On the other hand, it has been proved to the hilt that the three accused and their witnesses have fabricated evidence to pervert the course of justice in the hope that they would succeed in creating a reasonable doubt that would entitled them an acquittal." Tan subsequently fled to the UK in 1976 on a Singaporean passport with forged renewal endorsement and sought political asylum.

FUEMSSO

According to unverified government statements, Tan is supposed to have continued with his democratic activities even though he denies this.  His plan is supposed to have been to achieve political power through infiltration of mainstream organisations such as schools and unions to mobilise workers and establish strong grassroots support. To achieve that, Tan established himself as the leader of the Federation of United Kingdom and Eire Malaysian and Singapore Students' Organisations (FUEMSSO), which was used to recruit supporters for his cause.

Through FUEMSSO, Tan succeeded in recruiting several activists for his plans. Upon their return to Singapore, these students were supposed to join forces with a local group led by Vincent Cheng (one of those detained under Operation Spectrum) to penetrate lawful organisations and eventually dominate them, in preparation for Tan's seizure of political power.

Tan and his group also used FUEMSSO to launch a number of strident campaigns against the Singapore and Malaysian Governments. Most significantly, Tan and group actively campaigned on behalf of the Communist Party of Malaya (CPM) elements under detention in Singapore and Malaysia, demanding for the abolishment of detention without trial and immediate release of those under detention.

Tan Wah Piow responds
In his book, "Let the people judge – Confessions of the most wanted person in Singapore" published 10 June 1987, Tan Wah Piow related that, "Circumstances surrounding the call-up were most extraordinary and improper...The facts are simple. I was conscripted into the army to serve in the artillery unit on the very hour of my release from the one year sentence."  He says, "I too was worried for my physical well-being since 'accidents' can easily happen in the army."

Referring to the government's charges against him, Tan said, "I have stated in no uncertain terms that I am not involved in any conspiracy to overthrow the government. I have publicly expressed my opposition to any attempt, by anyone, to set up a communist state in Singapore." "As to how we bring about the implementation of the political programmes in Singapore, I stated in no uncertain terms in my writings, letters to friends and public speeches in the United Kingdom, that I sought to bring about political change in Singapore solely through the ballot box."

On his one-year prison term, Tan alleged that the illegal assembly and riot which took place at the Pioneer Industries Employees Union (PIEU) headquarters in the Jurong Industrial Estate was a 'frame-up" involving Phey Yew Kok, who was then the general secretary of PIEU. He claimed that it was "union officers" themselves who smashed up their own premises at the PIEU and says that at the time of the incident, he was instead seen outside the PIEU office by a Straits Times reporter, among others.

In 2016, after Phey's conviction for criminal breach of trust in 2016, Tan wrote to the Attorney-General V. K. Rajah to overturn his 1975 criminal conviction for rioting.

References

Singaporean activists
Living people
Singaporean people of Chinese descent
University of Singapore alumni
Year of birth missing (living people)